Leedey is a town in Dewey County, Oklahoma, United States. The population was 415 at the 2020 census.

History
On May 31, 1947, Leedey was hit by an F5 tornado. The tornado killed 7 people and heavily damaged the town.

Geography
Leedey is located at  (35.868518, −99.344124). It is approximately 34 miles north of Interstate 40 at Exit 41, the Elk City turnoff, via Oklahoma State Highway 34.

Demographics

As of the census of 2000, there were 345 people, 164 households, and 105 families residing in the town. There were 220 housing units at an average density of 561.3 per square mile (217.8/km2). The racial makeup of the town was 97.10% White, 1.45% Native American, 0.29% from other races, and 1.16% from two or more races. Hispanic or Latino of any race were 0.87% of the population.

There were 164 households, out of which 22.0% had children under the age of 18 living with them, 57.3% were married couples living together, 6.1% had a female householder with no husband present, and 35.4% were non-families. 33.5% of all households were made up of individuals, and 18.9% had someone living alone who was 65 years of age or older. The average household size was 2.10 and the average family size was 2.67.

In the town, the population was spread out, with 18.0% under the age of 18, 6.7% from 18 to 24, 22.9% from 25 to 44, 26.7% from 45 to 64, and 25.8% who were 65 years of age or older. The median age was 47 years. For every 100 females, there were 88.5 males. For every 100 females age 18 and over, there were 81.4 males.

The median income for a household in the town was $21,667, and the median income for a family was $33,125. Males had a median income of $23,438 versus $14,375 for females. The per capita income for the town was $17,151. About 18.2% of families and 19.4% of the population were below the poverty line, including 17.4% of those under age 18 and 16.8% of those age 65 or over.

Notable people
 Don Carman, former Major League pitcher for the Philadelphia Phillies, Cincinnati Reds, and Texas Rangers
 Darla Hood of the "Our Gang" series was born in Leedey on November 4, 1931.
 Pat Irwin (1921–1999), Justice of the Oklahoma State Supreme Court.
 Drew Ward, current professional baseball player for the Washington Nationals organization.

External links
 Leedey Public Schools

References

Towns in Dewey County, Oklahoma
Towns in Oklahoma